Maulana Hasanuddin  (also spelled Hasanuddin) was a ruler of the Banten Sultanate from c. 1552 to 1570. Hasanuddin was a Azmatkhani Ba 'Alawi Sayyid, the son of Sunan Gunungjati and Nyai Ratu Kawunganten.

He extended the domains of Banten to the pepper-producing region of Lampung, in South Sumatra. This area, which already had long-standing ties with West Java, facilitated Banten's rise to prominence as a pepper port.

Notes

Sultans of Banten
16th-century rulers in Asia
Pepper trade
1570 deaths
Indonesian people of Arab descent